A ChargeBox is a kiosk designed for charging a range of small devices including mobile phones, PDAs, iPods, PSPs, and other small, mobile electronics. 

They are usually located in public locations such as hotels, shopping centres and event spaces. 

Kiosks usually charge a small fee for charging and are secure, allowing the devices owner to charge and collect at their convenience. 

Other vending machines that are also capable of performing this function are operated by Photo-Me International. In Germany, a ChargeBox has the same purpose but is free to use, as it is financed by the integrated advertising space. They were introduced in 2005.

Usage 

ChargeBoxes allows the users of mobile devices to recharge them while away from home or the office. A YouGov survey conducted in June 2006 found that 61% of under-30-year-olds had run out of battery power on their mobiles while out and about within the previous month. Also, 48% of under-30-year-olds said that they had been in situations when they had wanted to use the features on their phones, but had refrained from doing so for fear of running out of battery power.

Locations 

The first machines have been sited at locations such as easyInternetcafes, Aurora Hotels, Holiday Inn, Novotel, Roadchef, Tower 42, Vodafone stores,  the Carphone Warehouse, and various airports. About one hundred ChargeBoxes are installed in the UK in total.

In September 2006, ChargeBox began to launch the product in countries beyond the United Kingdom.

See also 

 Charging station

References

External links 

 Chargebox.com
 Chargebox.de
 WTF Gadgets

Vending machines
Vending
Charging stations
2005 introductions
2005 establishments in the United Kingdom